Jasenik may refer to the following places in Bosnia and Herzegovina:

Jasenik (Gacko)
Jasenik (Konjic)